The International Indian School is an English medium 
school and was founded in 2002 in Ajman, United Arab Emirates. The school is recognized by the Ministry of Education, U.A.E. and affiliated to the Central Board of Secondary Education, New Delhi. In 2018 all 143 students who sat the grade 10 CBSE exams passed. The School is part of global International Indian Schools including International Indian School, Riyadh, International Indian School Jeddah.

The school has five sections, that is, the KG section, the primary I section (grade 1–3), the primary II section (grade 4–5), the boys section (grade 6-12 boys) and girls section (grade 6-12 girls), each one administrated by a section supervisor.

References

External links
iisajman.org

Schools in the Emirate of Ajman